Voggenreiter may refer to:

 Georg Voggenreiter (1912-1986), German racing cyclist
 Voggenreiter Verlag, a German music publisher